Intouchable is a French rap band from Choisy-le-Roi, Val-de-Marne, founded in 1992 by rappers Dry and Demon One. They are also part of the rap/urban collective Mafia K-1 Fry.

Besides important collaborations with the collective, the band released two albums, Les points sur les I in 2000 and La vie de rêve in 2005, as well as a mixtape and a maxi EP. Band members Dry and Demon One also released, in their turn, individual albums, mixtapes etc.

Members
Main members were Demon One and Dry. But Intouchable had, at one time, a number of other member rappers. But more than one member's departures was in tragic circumstances

M.S. (real name Mansa Konaté) - disappeared in 1998 never to be found
Las Montana (real name Lassana Touré) - died in 1999 in very strange circumstances
Mamad - (real name Mamoudou Doucouré) - died in 2003 immediately after the release of an album by the Mafia K'1 Fry collective 
Mokem - left the band

Discography

Albums
As Intouchable

Solo - Demon One

Solo - Dry

In collective Mafia K-1 Fry
1997 : Les liens sacrés
1999 : Légendaire
2003 : La cerise sur le ghetto
2007 : Jusqu'à la mort

Singles
As Intouchable

Appearances
(These are appearances as a band. For solo appearances, see Demon One and Dry pages)
As Intouchable (main)
1998: Intouchable feat 113 & Ideal J - "La voie que j'ai donné à ma vie" in compilation album Nouvelle donne
2001: Intouchable - "Freestyle" on the mixtape Pur son ghetto Vol. 1
2001: Intouchable feat OGB - "Rap local" in the compilation Vitry club
2003: Intouchable feat OGB - "Trouble" on soundtrack of film Taxi 3
2003: Intouchable feat Rohff & Kamelancien - "La hass" in the compilation Street lourd hall stars
2004: Intouchable feat Rohff - "Warriorz" in soundtrack of film Banlieue 13
2005: Intouchable - "Rap haute performance" in compilation Rap performance
2006: Intouchable feat Tonton David - "La gagne"
2006: Intouchable feat Courti Nostra - "Amène tes oreilles" in the compilation Street couleur
2006: Intouchable feat Natty - "Trop vite" in the compilation Street couleur
2006: Intouchable - "Mafia K'1 Fry" in the compilation Independenza labels
2006: Intouchable - "La puissance vient du ghetto" in the compilation album Kontract killer
2006: Intouchable - "La niak" in the compilation Hip Hop fight
2006: Intouchable feat Adams - "Interdit en radio" in the compilation Interdit en radio Vol.2
2007: Intouchable feat Massil, Ritax & Pobouf - "La vie d'un jeune" in the compilation  1re escale
2007: Intouchable - "Novembre 2005" in the compilation Block story
2007: Intouchable - "Hymne à la racaille" in the compilation Représente ta rue Vol.2
2007: Intouchable - "Chant de bataille" in the compilation Ghetto truands & Associés
2007: Intouchable feat Alibi Montana & SMS Click - "Tout le monde à terre" in the compilation Premier combat Vol.1
2007: Intouchable feat Six Coups MC & Sir Doum's - "Les vrais escrocs sont en costard" in the compilation Parole d'escrocs

As Intouchable (featured in)
1999: Rohff feat Intouchable - "Manimal" in the Rohff album  Le code de l'honneur
1999: 113 feat Intouchable - "Hold up" in 113 album Les princes de la ville
1999: Kennedy feat Intouchable - "La haine au cœur" in Kennedy's maxi Kennedy le sale gosse
2001: Oxmo Puccino feat Intouchable - "Les raisons du crime" in Oxmo Puccino album L'amour est mort
2001: Manu Key feat Intouchable - "A vive allure" in Manu Key's album Manuscrit
2001: Poésie Urbaine feat Intouchable & M. Clyde - "Sorti de nulle part" in the Poésie Urbaine maxi Réflexion sèche
2004: Rohff feat Intouchable - "Çà fait plaisir" in Rohff album La fierté des nôtres
2004: Alibi Montana feat Intouchable - "Le son du ghetto" in Alibi album 1260 jours
2005: WWO feat Intouchable - "Smak chwili" in the WWO album Witam was w rzeczywistości
2006: Booba feat Intouchable - "Au fond de la classe" in the Booba album Ouest Side
2006: Seven feat Intouchable - "Ça fout l'seum" in Seven's album Mode de vie étrange
2007: Manu Key feat Intouchable - "Le genre de mec" in Manu Kay album Prolifique Vol. 2
2007: Beli Blanco feat Intouchable - "Enragés"
2007: Sang Pleur feat Intouchable & Siko - "Block O.P.ratoire" in the compilation album  Block O.P.ratoire
2008: Kayliah feat Intouchable, Lino, Jacky & 2 Bal - "L'hymne du ghetto Remix" in the  Kayliah album Caractère
2008: L'Skadrille feat Intouchable - "T'as joué au con Part II" in the L'Skadrille album Des roses et des flinugues
2008: Gooki feat Intouchable & Dawala - "Mon Rap" in the Gooki album Trop de choses à dire
2009: Mister You feat Intouchable - "Le Guide de la débrouille" in Mister You album Misteur You, Arrete you si tu peux 
2011: Assoce 2 Malfrats feat Intouchable - "Pour ceux qui ont oublié" in the Assoce 2 Malfrats album L'amour du danger

References

French hip hop groups
Musical groups from Île-de-France